Neureut is the northernmost borough of the German city of Karlsruhe. It was the most populous rural community of Baden-Württemberg before being incorporated into Karlsruhe on 14 February 1975. Its population is about 18,900 people as of December 2020.

History
Neureut is recorded as having been founded in 1260, under the rule of Rudolf I, Margrave of Baden-Baden. In 1699, Frederick VII, Margrave of Baden-Durlach founded a church for 58 families of Huguenot refugees from nearby France. During World War II, Neureut was heavily damaged by American planes. After the war, many American military bases were established in Germany, including one in Neureut in 1959. The American military presence there lasted until 1995. In 1975, Neureut was incorporated into Karlsruhe despite local opposition.

Transport
Neureut is served by the S1 and S11 lines of the Karlsruhe Stadtbahn.

References

External links

Official website
Neureut at the Karlsruhe city wiki 

Karlsruhe
Populated places established in the 1260s
Boroughs of Karlsruhe